The Gouden Griffel (Golden Stylus) is an award given to authors of children's or teenagers' literature in the Netherlands.

History 

Since 1971, it is awarded each year during the Dutch Children's Books Week, by the Stichting Collectieve Propaganda van het Nederlandse Boek (Dutch Book Promotion Society) for the best children's books written in the past year. Between 1954 and 1970, one book per year was declared the "children's book of the year". Since then, griffels are awarded in several categories.

Only novels written in Dutch are eligible for the gouden griffel. However, the runner-up awards (Silver griffels) can also be given to translated works. Aside from these, the Gouden Penseel (golden paintbrush) is awarded to the best illustrated children's books (with silver penseel as a runner-up), and since 1997 the Gouden Zoen (golden kiss, with silver as a runner-up) is awarded to the best books for teenagers.

There is no award for 1960, as the award was then no longer named for the year of production of the book, but the year of the ceremony (i.e. one year later). Between 1966 and 1971, two awards were given, one for books for readers of ten years or less, and one for older readers. Until 1986, one or two awards were given, but without age categories. Since 1986, only one Gouden Griffel per year is awarded. No awards were given in 1967.

Since 2011, the Griffel is specifically for books for ages 6–12, and a new prize, the Gouden Lijst, was instated for books for ages 12–15. The inaugural winner was Rindert Kromhout for Soldaten huilen niet ("Soldiers don't cry"); there was also a Gouden Lijst for a translated boek, Mal Peet's Tamar.

Beste kinderboek van het jaar

 1954: An Rutgers van der Loeff-Basenau, Lawines razen, Ploegsma
 1955: Cor Bruijn, Lasse Länta, Ploegsma
 1956: Miep Diekmann, De boten van Brakkeput, Leopold
 1957: Annie M. G. Schmidt, Wiplala, De Arbeiderspers
 1958: Harriët Laurey, Sinterklaas en de struikrovers, Holland
 1959: C. E. Pothast-Grimberg, Corso het ezeltje, Van Goor
 1961: Jan Blokker, Op zoek naar een oom, De Bezige Bij
 1962: Jean Dulieu, Paulus, de hulpsinterklaas, Ploegsma
 1963: Tonke Dragt, De brief voor de koning, Leopold
 1964: W. F. H. Visser, Niku de koerier, Van Goor
 1965: Paul Biegel, Het sleutelkruid, Holland
 1966: (Age -10): Mies Bouhuys, Kinderverhalen, Holland
 (Age +10): Toos Blom, Loeloedji, kleine rode bloem, De Arbeiderspers
 1967: No awards
 1968: (Age -10): Hans Werner, Mattijs Mooimuziek, Westfriesland
 (Age +10): Siny van Iterson, De adjudant van de vrachtwagen, Leopold
 1969: (Age -10): Hans Andreus, Meester Pompelmoes en de Mompelpoes, Holland
 (Age +10): Henk Van Kerkwijk, Komplot op volle zee, Ploegsma
 1970: (Age -10): Harriët Laurey, Verhalen van de spinnende kater, Holland
 (Age +10): Frank Herzen, De zoon van de woordbouwer, Sijthoff

Gouden Griffel

 1971: (Age -10): Leonie Kooiker, Het malle ding van Bobbistiek, Ploegsma
 (Age +10): Alet Schouten, De mare van de witte toren, Van Holkema & Warendorf
 1972: Paul Biegel, De kleine kapitein, Holland
 Jan Terlouw, Koning van Katoren, Lemniscaat
 1973: Henk Barnard, De Marokkaan en de kat van tante Da, Van Holkema & Warendorf
 Jan Terlouw, Oorlogswinter, Lemniscaat
 1974: Jaap ter Haar, Het wereldje van Beer Ligthart, Van Holkema & Waredorf
 Thea Beckman, Kruistocht in spijkerbroek, Lemniscaat
 1975: Simone Schell, De nacht van de heksenketelkandij, Deltos-Elsevier
 Alet Schouten, Iolo komt niet spelen, Van Holkema & Warendorf
 1976: Guus Kuijer, Met de poppen gooien, Querido
 1977: Henk Barnard, Kon Hesi Baka / Kom gauw terug, Van Holkema & Warendorf
 1978: Miep Diekmann, Wiele wiele stap, Querido
 Els Pelgrom, De kinderen van het achtste woud, Kosmos
 1979: Guus Kuijer, Krassen in het tafelblad, Querido
 1980: Simone Schell, Zeezicht, Van Goor
 1981: Annie M. G. Schmidt, Otje, Querido
 1982: Nannie Kuiper, De eend op de pot, Leopold
 1983: Anton Quintana, De bavianenkoning, Van Goor
 1984: Veronica Hazelhoff, Auww!, Sjaloom
 Karel Eykman, Liefdesverdriet, De Harmonie
 1985: Els Pelgrom, Kleine Sofie en Lange Wapper, Querido
 1986: Joke van Leeuwen, Deesje, Querido
 Willem Wilmink, Waar het hart vol van is, Van Holkema & Warendorf
 1987: Harriët van Reek, De avonturen van Lena lena, Querido
 1988: Toon Tellegen, Toen niemand iets te doen had, Querido
 1989: Wim Hofman, Het vlot, Van Holkema & Warendorf
 1990: Els Pelgrom, De eikelvreters, Querido
 1991: Tine van Buul and Bianca Stigter (editors), Als je goed om je heen kijkt zie je dat alles gekleurd is, Querido
 1992: Max Velthuijs, Kikker en het vogeltje, Leopold
 1993: Paul Biegel, Nachtverhaal, Leopold
 1994: Toon Tellegen, Bijna iedereen kon omvallen, Querido
 1995: Ted van Lieshout, Begin een torentje van niks, Leopold
 1996: Guus Middag, Ik maak nooit iets mee, De Bezige Bij
 1997: Sjoerd Kuyper, Robin en God, Leopold
 1998: Wim Hofman, Zwart als inkt, Querido
 1999: Anne Makkink, Helden op sokken, Querido
 2000: Guus Kuijer, Voor altijd samen, amen, Querido
 2001: Ingrid Godon and André Sollie, Wachten op Matroos, Querido
 2002: Peter van Gestel, Winterijs, De Fontein
 2003: Daan Remmerts de Vries, Godje, Querido
 2004: Hans Hagen, De dans van de drummers, van Goor
Griffel der Griffels (best book of the past 50 years): Tonke Dragt, De brief voor de koning.
 2005: Guus Kuijer, Het boek van alle dingen, Querido
 2006: Mireille Geus, Big, Lemniscaat
 2007: Marjolijn Hof, Een kleine kans, Querido
 2008: Jan Paul Schutten, Kinderen van Amsterdam, Nieuw Amsterdam
 2009: Peter Verhelst, Het geheim van de keel van de nachtegaal, De Eenhoorn
 2010: Daan Remmerts de Vries, Voordat jij er was, Querido
 2011: Simon van der Geest, Dissus, Querido
 2012: Bibi Dumon Tak, Winterdieren, Querido
 2013: Simon van der Geest, Spinder, Querido
 2014: Jan Paul Schutten, Het raadsel van alles wat leeft – en de stinksokken van Jos Grootjes uit Driel, Gottmer
 2015: Bette Westera, Doodgewoon, Gottmer
 2016: Anna Woltz, Gips, Querido
 2017: Koos Meinderts, Naar het noorden, Hoogland & Van Klaveren
 2018: Annet Schaap, Lampje, Querido
 2019: Gideon Samson, Zeb., Leopold
 2020: Bette Westera, Uit elkaar, Gottmer
 2021: Pieter Koolwijk, Gozert, Lemniscaat

Gouden Penseel
 1973: Margriet Heymans, Hollidee, de circuspony''', Lemniscaat
 1974: Wim Hofman, Koning Wikkepokluk zoekt een rijk, Van Holkema & Warendorf
 1975: Paul Hulshof, Iolo komt niet spelen, Van Holkema & Warendorf
 1976: Lidia Postma, Sprookjes en vertellingen van H. C. Andersen, Van Holkema & Warendorf
 1977: Max Velthuijs, Het goedige monster en de rovers, Dr. W. Junk
 1978: Thé Tjong-Khing, Wiele wiele stap, Querido
 Jan Marinus Verburg, Tom Tippelaar, Querido
 1979: Tom Eyzenbach, Het wonderlijke verhaal van Hendrik Meier, De Fontein
 1980: Joke van Leeuwen, Een huis met zeven kamers, Omniboek
 1981: Piet Klaasse, Sagen en legenden van de Lage Landen, Van Holkema & Warendorf
 1982: Joost Roelofsz, Voor en achter, Meulenhoff
 1983: No award
 1984: Wim Hofman, Aap en beer, Van Holkema & Warendorff
 1985: Thé Tjong-Khing, Kleine Sofie en Lange Wapper, Querido
 1986: Max Velthuijs, Klein-Mannetje vindt het geluk, De Vier Windstreken
 1987: Dieter Schubert, Monkie, Lemniscaat
 1988: Margriet Heymans, Annetje Lie in het holst van de nacht, Van Holkema & Warendorf
 1989: Alfons van Heusden, Dat rijmt, Bert Bakker
 1990: Dick Bruna, Boris Beer, Van Goor
 1991: Peter Vos, Lieve kinderen hoor mijn lied, De Harmonie
 1992: , Waarom niet?, Arion
 1993: Max Velthuijs, Kikker in de kou, Leopold
 1994: Jan Jutte, Lui Lei Enzo, Zwijsen
 1995: Harrie Geelen, Het beertje Pippeloentje, Querido
 1996: Geerten Ten Bosch, De verjaardag van de eekhoorn, Querido
 1997: Max Velthuijs, Kikker is Kikker, Leopold
 1998: Margriet Heymans, De wezen van Woesteland, Querido
 1999: Annemarie van Haeringen, Malmok, Leopold
 2000: Annemarie van Haeringen, De prinses met de lange haren, Leopold
 2001: Jan Jutte, Tien stoute katjes, Leopold
 2002: Peter van Gestel, Winterijs, De Fontein
 2003: Thé Tjong-Khing, Het woordenboek van Vos en Haas, Lannoo
 2004: Jan Jutte, Een muts voor de maan, Leopold
 2005: Annemarie van Haeringen, Beer is op Vlinder, Leopold
 2006: Marit Törnqvist, Pikkuhenki, Querido
 2007: Joke van Leeuwen, Heb je mijn zusje gezien, Querido
 2008: Charlotte Dematons, Sinterklaas, Lemniscaat
 2009: Sieb Posthuma, Boven in een groene linde zat een moddervette haan, Gottmer
 2010: Marije Tolman and Ronald Tolman, De boomhut, Lemniscaat
 2011: Blexbolex, Seizoenen, Clavis
 2012: Sieb Posthuma, Een vijver vol inkt, Querido
 2013: Sylvia Weve, Aan de kant, ik ben je oma niet!, Gottmer
 2014: Floor Rieder, Het Raadsel van alles wat leeft en de stinksokken van Jos Grootjes uit Driel, Gottmer
 2015: Alice Hoogstad, Monsterboek, Lemniscaat
 2016: Harriët van Reek, Lettersoep 2017: Martijn van der Linden, Tangramkat 2018: Ludwig Volbeda and Floortje Zwigtman, Fabeldieren 2019: Yvonne Jagtenberg, Mijn wonderlijke oomGouden Zoen
 1997: Karlijn Stoffels, Mosje en Reizele, Querido
 1998: Anne Provoost, De roos en het zwijn, Querido
 1999: Edward van de Vendel, Gijsbrecht, Querido
 2000: Edward van de Vendel, De dagen van de bluegrassliefde, Querido
 2001: Marita de Sterck, Wild vlees, Querido
 2002: Anne Provoost, De arkvaarders, Querido
 2003: Isabel Hoving, De gevleugelde kat, Querido
 2004: Els Beerten, Lopen voor je leven, Querido
 2005: Benny Lindelauf, Negen open armen, Querido
 2006: Floortje Zwigtman, Schijnbewegingen, De Fontein
 2007: Edward van de Vendel, Ons derde lichaam, Querido
 2008: Jan Simoen, Slecht'', Querido
The Gouden Zoen is no longer awarded.

References

External links
www.cpnb.nl, Collectieve Propaganda van het Nederlandse Boek
kinderboekenweek.net

Children's literary awards
Dutch children's literature
Dutch literary awards
Articles containing video clips